The 1996 Páginas Amarillas Open was a women's tennis tournament played on outdoor clay courts in Madrid in Spain that was part of Tier II of the 1996 WTA Tour. It was the inaugural edition of the tournament and was held from 21 May until 25 May 1996. Jana Novotná won the singles title.

Headers

Singles

 Jana Novotná defeated  Magdalena Maleeva 4–6, 6–4, 6–3
 It was Novotná's 4th title of the year and the 70th of her career.

Doubles

 Jana Novotná /  Arantxa Sánchez Vicario defeated  Sabine Appelmans /  Miriam Oremans 7–6, 6–2
 It was Novotná's 5th title of the year and the 71st of her career. It was Sánchez Vicario's 9th title of the year and the 71st of her career.

References

External links
 ITF tournament edition details
 Tournament draws

 
Paginas
WTA Madrid Open (tennis)
Paginas